The 2019–20 season is Guillermo Brown's 6th consecutive season in the second division of Argentine football, Primera B Nacional.

The season generally covers the period from 1 July 2019 to 30 June 2020.

Review

Pre-season
Ascenso MX side Atlante signed Federico Rasmussen on 6 June 2019, as the centre-back became Guillermo Brown's first departure of 2019–20. Youngster Elvio Gelmini followed Rasmussen out the door as he agreed to join Defensores de Belgrano on 10 June. A triple signing was made by the club on 13 June, with Franco Agüero (GK, Sansinena), Kevin Ceceri (LB, Unattached - most recently with Linense) and Mateo Ramírez (MF, Gimnasia y Esgrima (M) putting pen to paper on contracts. A loan for Lautaro Parisi was confirmed on 25 June, with the forward set to spend the campaign with Arsenal de Sarandí of the Primera División. Experienced midfielder Jorge Velázquez left on 27 June, making a move to Barracas Central. He was matched in going by Sebastián Giovini.

Mateo Acosta officially returned from his previous season loan at Gimnasia y Esgrima (M) on 30 June. On 4 July, Guillermo Brown completed the loan signing of Matías Ruíz Díaz from Estudiantes (LP). Acassuso communicated the signing of Julián Bartolo hours later. Mauro Osores was loaned from Primera División team Atlético Tucumán on 19 July. Julián Bonetto, who spent the past season in Torneo Federal A with Alvarado, arrived to Guillermo Brown on 20 July. Abel Méndez and Rodrigo Depetris completed moves in on 23 July, a day prior to the arrivals of Diego Herner, César Taborda and Braian Maya. On 24 July, Guillermo Brown contested their first pre-season game against Sol de Mayo - with a two-goal loss being followed by a goalless draw in Puerto Madryn.

25 July saw Facundo Soloa join on loan from Atlético de Rafaela, with Estudiantes' Mauricio Vera doing likewise on 2 August. Days before, Guillermo Brown beat Gaiman 3–0 in an exhibition fixture on 30 July. Then, on 3 August, they and Chacarita Juniors shared victories in friendlies; with new signing Abel Méndez sealing Guillermo Brown's win. On 5 August, Temperley were defeated in a friendly thanks to goals from Joel Martínez (2) and Méndez; in the day's secondary encounter, their opponents reversed the scoreline for a victory. Guillermo Brown failed to beat Atlanta in pre-season encounters on 7 August, with the newly-promoted Primera B Nacional team winning and drawing. In the week after, Leandro Lugarzo, Facundo Pumpido and Ezequiel Ávila joined.

August
On 18 August, Barracas Central visited the Estadio Raúl Conti and took away all three points in each club's first 2019–20 fixture in Primera B Nacional. A second straight defeat came on 24 August, with Deportivo Morón running out one-nil winners in Buenos Aires.

September
September opened with a home loss to Temperley for Guillermo Brown, with Enzo Baglivo netting the game's sole goal on 1 September - making it three consecutive defeats for Marcelo Broggi.

Squad

Transfers
Domestic transfer windows:3 July 2019 to 24 September 201920 January 2020 to 19 February 2020.

Transfers in

Transfers out

Loans in

Loans out

Friendlies

Pre-season

Competitions

Primera B Nacional

Results summary

Matches
The fixtures for the 2019–20 league season were announced on 1 August 2019, with a new format of split zones being introduced. Guillermo Brown were drawn in Zone A.

Squad statistics

Appearances and goals

Statistics accurate as of 3 September 2019.

Notes

References

Guillermo Brown de Puerto Madryn seasons
Guillermo Brown